John Stewart McInally (26 September 1951 – 5 June 2012) was a Scottish footballer who played in the English Football League as a goalkeeper for Lincoln City and Colchester United. He began his career with Manchester United but failed to break into the first team.

Career

McInally, born in Gatehouse of Fleet, began his career with Manchester United, but failed to make a first-team appearance for the club. In 1970, he signed for Lincoln City, making his debut on 19 December in a 2–1 away defeat to Brentford in the Fourth Division. McInally made 22 Football League appearances for the Imps, making his final appearance on 29 April 1972 in a 4–0 win at home to Chester.

In November 1972, McInally signed for Colchester United on loan from Lincoln, making one appearance in a 3–1 win against Southport on 10 November before being signed permanently, making his second and full-time debut on 25 November in a 1–0 win against Reading at Elm Park. He made 27 league appearances for the U's and made his final appearance on 30 April 1973 in a 4–0 win at Layer Road against Gillingham.

McInally left Colchester in the summer of 1973 joining Braintree & Crittall Athletic, where he went on to become player-manager.

McInally died in his native Gatehouse of Fleet in 2012 at the age of 60.

References

1951 births
2012 deaths
Footballers from Dumfries and Galloway
Scottish footballers
Association football goalkeepers
Manchester United F.C. players
Lincoln City F.C. players
Colchester United F.C. players
Braintree Town F.C. players
English Football League players
Scottish football managers
Braintree Town F.C. managers